Zone A of the 1995 Davis Cup Europe/Africa Group III was one of two zones in the Europe/Africa Group III of the 1995 Davis Cup. 11 teams competed across two pools in a round robin competition, with the top team in each pool advancing to Group II in 1996.

Participating nations

Draw
 Venue: Centro Tennis Cassa di Risparmio, San Marino, San Marino
 Date: 10–14 May

Group A

Group B

  and  promoted to Group II in 1996.

Group A

Cameroon vs. Macedonia

Georgia vs. Tunisia

Bulgaria vs. Cameroon

Macedonia vs. Tunisia

Bulgaria vs. Tunisia

Georgia vs. Macedonia

Bulgaria vs. Macedonia

Cameroon vs. Georgia

Bulgaria vs. Georgia

Cameroon vs. Tunisia

Group B

San Marino vs. Greece

Benin vs. Yugoslavia

Moldova vs. Togo

San Marino vs. Togo

Benin vs. Moldova

Greece vs. Yugoslavia

San Marino vs. Yugoslavia

Benin vs. Togo

Greece vs. Moldova

San Marino vs. Benin

Greece vs. Togo

Moldova vs. Yugoslavia

San Marino vs. Moldova

Benin vs. Greece

Togo vs. Yugoslavia

References

External links
Davis Cup official website

Davis Cup Europe/Africa Zone
Europe Africa Zone Group III